Tribute is the second live album and third concert film by Greek keyboardist and songwriter Yanni, released in November 1997 on Virgin Records. It was recorded at the Taj Mahal, India in March 1997 and the Forbidden City, China, in May 1997, both featuring Yanni performing with a seven-piece band, choir, and 27-piece orchestra.

Tribute went to No. 1 on the Billboard Top New Age Album chart and No. 21 on the Billboard 200. The concert film was released in December 1997. In March 1998, the album was certified platinum by the Recording Industry Association of America (RIAA) for selling one million copies in the US. Yanni supported the album with the Tribute World Tour between January and July 1998, after which he put his career on a two-year hiatus.

Background
In 1994, Yanni released his first live album, Live at the Acropolis, which saw him perform with his band and orchestra at the Herodes Atticus Theatre in his native Greece. It became his best selling album of his career with 4 million copies sold in the US alone. Yanni was influenced to perform at such locations while visiting his father in Greece following the success of the Acropolis concerts, who thought it was a shame "After going so far with my music, not to take it all the way around the world." This led to Yanni's desire to stage concerts at other historic sites and the decision to perform in India and China, which he said took around two-and-a-half years to plan and cost around $4 million.

The shows at the Taj Mahal took place on three nights in March 1997, as part of celebrations around the fiftieth anniversary of Indian independence. A temporary concert site was constructed which involved the Indian army building bridges across the River Yamuna. The shows included a light display that marked the first time the monument was illuminated at night. The concerts were met with some protests against them, claiming the lighting and sound systems would harm the building and its surroundings. Some local farmers went so far to threaten to immolate themselves on the site, until a financial settlement between them, the Indian government, and Yanni was agreed upon. Yanni later said that the reports of immolation were rumours that were generated by the political dispute, and that he had met a group of local farmers and had tea with them which he said helped defuse the situation. "And they said 'no, we're not crazy.'" The Supreme Court of India threw out a case filed by the Archaeological Survey of India that tried to cancel the shows. A portion of the receipts was donated toward conserving the Taj Mahal, which is affected by smoke and brick kilns. The second concert was broadcast live on Indian television. Yanni was particularly nervous about presenting a setlist of new music and whether the Indian public thought what he did was "appropriate and respectful toward the monument."

The shows at the Forbidden City followed in May 1997 and took place at the courtyard at the Imperial Ancestral Temple. This marked the first time a Western artist in modern times was permitted perform at the location. The project began after Yanni received an invitation from the China National Culture and Arts Corp. Before the Forbidden City was chosen, locations by the Great Wall of China and the Temple of Heaven were possible candidates to stage the shows. The show's promoters asked for 5,000 seats, but they had to settle for around 4,000, hundreds of which were reserved for Chinese officials. A request to beam lights from inside the temple outward was denied. The crew were instructed to have the sound no louder than 40 decibels. Before the show, Yanni performed sold out shows at arenas in Shanghai and Guangzhou. Later in 1997, Yanni deemed the audiences as the best of his career.

Yanni hired Armenian conductor Armen Anassian for the tour "on faith"; he had not seen Anassian perform before. The conductor recalled being sceptical about the tour, "But the truth is, it happened. We did it" and said it was a "life-changing experience."

Album

Critical reception

In a review by Jonathan Widran of AllMusic, "Yanni's gargantuan popularity unfortunately makes him an easy target for those who see his orchestrally inspired works as glorified musical wallpaper. But if they'd listen for the whole picture before judging, it would be clear that he brings classically influenced symphonic qualities to modern instrumental music; it's highly charged film scoring, only without the movie. The musical images comprising Tribute and the photos in the packaging come from the famous places that not only inspired it but at which it was performed: India's Taj Mahal and China's Forbidden City. While conventional string and brass instruments lead the way, Pedro Eustache's bamboo sax and Doodook and the gypsy-flavored lead violin of Karen Briggs supply appropriate dashes of Eastern culture. "Waltz in 7/8" combines the traditional western rhythm scheme with Eustache's exotic flute improvisation. As always, Yanni plays keyboards, but he's more a ringmaster/conductor of an inspiring, symphonic brew that includes gospel and flamenco (with rousing vocals and an accompanying guitar textured over a mid size string section), powerful violin/funky sax duets (the core of the seven-minute "Renegade"), improvisational trumpet ("Dance with a Stranger"), and an intoxicating weave of an orchestra with upward climbing operatic voices. Yanni and friends tap on another culture on the closing track, the previously recorded African tribal piece "Niki Nana", which features Eustache's percussive flute and a hooky wordless vocal chant from a gospel-flavored, female choir. As we see from the other artists this month, there are many ways to build musical bridges between East and West; Yanni's approach is spiritual grandeur in a beautiful, theatrical setting."

Track listing

RIAA certification
Recording Industry Association of America (RIAA) Gold and Platinum database entries:
 (G=Gold, P=Platinum, M=Multi-Platinum)
YANNI	TRIBUTE	03/11/98	VIRGIN	P	ALBUM	SOLO	Std  
YANNI	TRIBUTE	03/11/98	VIRGIN	G	ALBUM	SOLO	Std

Video

Track listing
"Deliverance"
"Adagio in C Minor"
"Renegade"
"Waltz in 7/8"
"Tribute"
"Dance with a Stranger"
"Nightingale"
"Southern Exposure"
"Prelude"
"Love Is All"
"Niki Nana (We're One)"
"Santorini"

Sound

PersonnelMusicYanni – keyboards
Karen Briggs – violin, chorus on "Niki Nana (We're One)"
Daniel de los Reyes – percussion, chorus on "Niki Nana (We're One)"
Pedro Eustache – flute, soprano saxophone, bamboo saxophone, duduk, quena, Chinese flute, ney, bass flute, chorus on "Niki Nana (We're One)"
Ric Fierabracci – bass guitar
Ming Freeman – keyboards
David Hudson – didgeridoo
Ramon Stagnaro – guitar, charango, chorus on "Niki Nana (We're One)"
Joel Taylor – drums
Alfreda Gerald – vocals, lead vocals on "Niki Nana (We're One)"
Vann Johnson – vocals, lead vocals on "Love Is All"
Jeanette Clinger – vocals
Catte Adams – vocals
Armen Anassian – conductor, violin on "Tribute"
Clif Foster – first violin, concertmaster
Beth Folsom – violin
Julian Hallmark – violin
Sayuri Kawada – violin
Neal Laite – violin
Ann Lasley – violin, chorus on "Niki Nana (We're One)"
Will Logan – violin
Julie Metz – violin
Pam Moore – violin
Cheryl Ongaro – violin, chorus on "Niki Nana (We're One)"
Delia Park – violin, chorus on "Niki Nana (We're One)"
Irina Voloshina – violin
Corinne Chapelle – violin
German Markosian – viola
Eugene Mechtovich – viola
Cathy Paynter – viola, chorus on "Niki Nana (We're One)"
John Krovoza – cello
Sarah O'Brien – cello
Lisa Pribanic – cello
Alexander Zhiroff – cello
Gary Lasley – contra bass, chorus on "Niki Nana (We're One)"
April Aoki – harp
Cheryl Foster – oboe
Matt Reynolds – French horn, chorus on "Niki Nana (We're One)"
James Mattos – French horn
Paul Klintworth – French horn
Doug Lyons – French horn
Luis Aquino – trumpet
Kerry Hughes – trumpet
Rich Berkeley – trombone
Dana Hughes – trombone, bass tromboneProduction'''
Yanni – production, arranger, engineer, orchestrations
Anthony Stabile – assistant engineer
Tommy Sterling – assistant engineer
Paul Sarault - monitor engineer
Curtis Kelly - monitor engineer / technician
Jeffrey Mark Silverman – orchestrations

The Tribute World Tour 1998

Dates
1997-1998

Cities
For cities, see below

Set list
"Deliverance"
"Adagio in C Minor"
"Renegade"
"Waltz in 7/8"
"Tribute"
"Dance with a Stranger"
"Within Attraction"
"Aria"
"Keys to Imagination"
"Nightingale"
"Southern Exposure"
"Marching Season"
"Nostalgia"
"Prelude/Love Is All"
"Acroyali/Standing in Motion"
"Reflections of Passion"
"Niki Nana (We're One)"
"Santorini"

Tour production
Business Manager: Tom Paske
Video Director/Producer: George Veras
Tour Accountants: Diane Kramer, Pete Dorsey
Yanni Management Tour Support Staff: Anda Allenson, Richard Allenson

Tour dates

Charts

Certifications

References

External links
 Official Website
 
 Tribute at Allmovie
 

Concert films
Yanni live albums
Yanni video albums
Yanni concert tours
1997 live albums
Live instrumental albums
Albums recorded in India